The Gymnasium bei St. Anna is a school in Augsburg, Bavaria, Germany, founded in 1531 and still active.

History
The school was founded in 1531 by the then  predominantly Evangelical Council of the City of Augsburg as a counterweight to the Catholic cathedral and monastery schools. It was to persuade the noble families of the city about an alternative to education of their children. The prevailing practice was to hire private tutors, many of them incompetent and outmoded. St Anne Gymnasium was the school to be trusted to educate new leaders for the Protestant town. The students were from the age 7 to 16 and taught in nine classes: the literature, introduction to the dialectic ( logic), and rhetoric based on the ancient Greek and Latin, a little Hebrew. There were also teachers competent in Mathematics, Music and Calligraphy.  On the other hand, the school lacked any instruction in German and the modern foreign languages.

The first Rector of the Gymnasium was a German playwright, Sixtus Birck (1536-1554.) Under his leadership the school acquired an excellent reputation as a reformed and progressive institution. This tradition was further developed under Hieronymus Wolf’s  leadership who recruited an outstanding faculty to tech at the Gymnasium including Georg Henisch

References
 Köberlin, Karl, Geschichte des Hum. Gymnasiums bei St. Anna in Augsburg von 1531 bis 1931. Zur Vierhundertjahrfeier der Anstalt, Augsburg 1931.
 Freudenberger, Rudolf, Das Evangelische Gymnasium und das Evangelische Kolleg bei St. Anna in der Zeit des Dreißigjährigen Krieges, in: Das Gymnasium bei St. Anna in Augsburg. 475 Jahre von 1531 bis 2006, hg. v. Karl-August Keil, Augsburg 2006, S. 53–72.

External links

1531 establishments in the Holy Roman Empire
Buildings and structures in Augsburg
Gymnasiums in Germany
Schools in Bavaria